The sugar industry is an important industry in Australia valued at $1.5 billion to $2.5 billion per annum, much of which is generated through export. Requiring a hot climate and plenty of water, sugarcane is predominantly grown in Queensland with some in northern New South Wales. Over 4000 sugar cane farms produce 32-35 million tonnes of sugar cane each year, from which 4-4.5 million tonnes of raw sugar is extracted at sugarcane mills. At 2011, there were 24 sugar mills in Australia, ranging from Mossman in Queensland to Grafton in New South Wales. Mackay Region is known for its five locally owned mills. Altogether they produce enough sugar to support Central Queensland and Northern Queensland. They range from Racecourse Sugar Mill, Farleigh Mill, Marian Mill, Proserpine Mill and Sarina Sugar Shed. Queensland's first industrial-scale sugar plantation commenced in Moreton Bay in 1864.

List of operating sugar mills in Queensland 
This is a list of the sugar cane mills in Queensland, ordered from north to south.

The sugar mills in northern New South Wales are located in Broadwater, Condong, and Harwood Island.

Former sugar mills in Queensland
Poor roads and limited transport options meant that there were once many local sugar mills in Queensland. With improved transport options, many of these smaller mills closed and only the larger more economic mills remain. This list is likely to be incomplete as many mills were small and operated only for a short period leaving few records. They are ordered from north to south, although in some cases the location is not known very accurately.

References

Further reading

External links

 
Queensland-related lists
Queensland mills
Economy of Australia-related lists